This is a list of political parties by reported number of members. These reported membership numbers are usually claimed by the parties themselves and may not have been confirmed by independent studies.

Currently active political parties

Parties with over 50 million members

Parties with 5 million – 50 million members

Parties with 1 million – 5 million members

Parties with 100 thousand – 1 million members

Formerly active political parties with over 1 million members
Note: This list only includes parties which were dissolved and their successor parties are clearly different from them.

See also
Lists of political parties
List of political ideologies

Notes

References

Largest